Allan Conrad Praskin (December 17, 1948, in Los Angeles) is an American jazz musician (alto saxophone player, composer and bandleader). He is living in Europe for more than 30 years.

Life and works 
Praskin had clarinette lessons, when he was very young. But very soon, he became acquainted with jazz through his father's record collection, which induced him finally to change his main instrument to alto saxophone. He had his first practical experience of improvised music, when he was a teenager in his home city, Los Angeles, where the jazz scene was very lively at that time. He became acquainted with modern jazz under George Morrow's aegis (the bass player in the Clifford Brown/Max Roach quintet). During his lessons under Morrow, he got to know other prominent musicians who lived in California like Bobby Hutcherson, J. R. Monterose and Harold Land—whom he also worked with.

At the end of the 1960s—at an important time in the Vietnam war—Praskin was conscripted into the army, but he was sent to Korea and not to Indochina. During his short stay in Tokyo in 1971, his first LP record, Encounter, was published on Three Blind Mice. He also played as a sideman on Hideto Kanai's record Q.

As a result, he came into contact with the flourishing free jazz scene of New York City. He made a name for himself very soon among the avant-garde in the metro-pole through jam sessions and recordings with leading musicians like Sunny Murray, Beaver Harris and Sam Rivers.

Gunter Hampel joined Praskin in 1972 for his Galaxie Dream Band. Praskin was a member of the band until 1975. As a member of this band, he made an extensive tour in Europe in 1973, where he eventually moved. During the following years, he turned to his musical interest, the old style of jazz, without quitting his experiences from the free playing style. This led to his collaboration with artists of different styles like Barbara Dennerlein (organist), Özay Fecht (singer), Fritz Pauer (pianist), Branislav Lala Kovačev (percussion player), Warne Marsh (saxophone player) and Hans Koller (saxophone player). Many years of musical partnership connected Praskin with the pianists Wolfgang Köhler and Larry Porter. Along with Porter, he led the Porter/Praskin quartet from 1984 to 1993. The quartet had different casts and had several notable recordings. The collaboration with Köhler began in the group Just Friends in the 1970s. This collaboration has continued to the present time.

References 

American jazz saxophonists
American male saxophonists
1948 births
Living people
American jazz composers
American male jazz composers
Musicians from Los Angeles
21st-century American saxophonists
Jazz musicians from California
21st-century American male musicians